Endless Wire may refer to:

Endless Wire (The Who album), or the title song
Endless Wire (Gordon Lightfoot album), or the title song